SAE protocol J1922 is a standard for "Powertrain Control Interface for Electronic Controls Used in Medium- and Heavy-Duty Diesel On-Highway Vehicle Applications" (published December 4, 2008).  This SAE Recommended Practice provides a development or possibly interim production communication protocol between engine, transmission, ABS/traction control, and retarder systems until higher speed communication links are established.

See also
J1708

External links
SAE International Website

Automotive standards